AAg-Chem Equipment Company was a manufacturer of nutrient and pesticide application equipment that was founded in Jackson, Minnesota USA.  It was sold to AGCO Corporation in 2001.

History
After receiving his bachelor's degree from the University of Missouri in 1954, Al McQuinn, the founder of Ag-Chem Equipment Co., served in the Army until 1957.  Upon his departure from the armed forces, he went to work for Federal Chemical Company which sold row crop sprayers.  These sprayers and others like it didn't do a very good job of applying product.  The solubles in the product would often settle in the solution which led to inconsistent, watered-down applications and unhappy customers.

In 1963, McQuinn set out to find a "solution for his solution".  He developed a sparger agitator, a device which recirculates liquid product to keep the solubles suspended in their solution until they are applied, in a garage in Jackson, Minnesota. Ag-Chem Equipment Co., Inc. was born.

Advancements in fertilizer and farm chemical technology in the 1970s paved the way for more intense production agriculture in the United States.  New fertility management practices, more acres in production, and the need for less soil compaction drove Ag-Chem's application equipment to larger capacity and higher flotation machines.  In 1974, the company made its first acquisition by purchasing Ag-Tec, Inc.  AgTec, Inc., a former subsidiary of Stokely-Van Camp, manufactured spray application equipment used in orchards, gardens, groves, and vineyards.

In 1980, Ag-Chem first appeared in "The Corporate Report 100", an annual ranking of Minnesota's largest publicly traded companies.  In the same year the first international equipment sale was completed.  Newly developed pneumatic dry spreaders required greater horsepower and efficiency and brought about the development of the 1800 and 1900 series TerraGators.  The United States farm economy was severely depressed from 1981 to 1986. Major U.S. manufacturers were faced with consolidations, takeovers by foreign companies, and the elimination of established product lines. Ag-Chem continued to dominate its markets in 1981 in spite of deteriorating economic conditions. Rickel Manufacturing Co., a company founded by Ed Rickel and known for their "Terra Tires" and Big A® product line, was acquired by Ag-Chem™ in 1983 and one year later Ag-Chem™'s first four-wheel flotation unit for agricultural use, the TerraGator 1664, was introduced

Ag-Chem lost money in 1985 and 1986. Its locally traded over-the-counter stock sold for pennies a share. In 1987, the company closed its Salina, Kansas, plant and consolidated production in Jackson: total company assets were reduced from $21.9 million to $11.6 million. According to the company, its cost-cutting programs and the loyalty of employees and suppliers helped Ag-Chem survive the period.

In 1991, Ag-Chem purchased Benson, Minnesota-based LorAl Products, Inc. and a 60% share of Soil Teq, Inc.'s holdings.  Soil Teq, Inc. developed the patented SOILECTION® process which was a pioneer in the variable-rate application of fertilizers and pesticides.  The acquisition of both assets furthered the company's earnest site-specific efforts to refine the concept of variable-rate application into a practical set of high-tech tools.

Conservation tillage in the 1990s required adaptation of new chemical and fertilizer application technologies for post-emergent weed control.  Ag-Chem responded by bringing the RoGator® 664 to market in 1993.  Agriculture professionals recognized the potential of site-specific resource management from an agronomic perspective as well as the economic and environmental benefits.  In 1995, Ag-Chem purchased the remaining 40% interest in Soil Teq, Inc. and continued to develop a comprehensive "total package".  Expanded offerings included continually updated mapping software, variable-rate product controllers, and variable-rate application systems.

In 2001, the company was purchased by AGCO Corporation.  The acquisition was beneficial to both parties as Ag-Chem now had larger funding, engineering, and distribution tools at its disposal and AGCO gained a solid foothold in the self-propelled application market among the other major Ag equipment manufacturers.

Machine models

First self-propelled sprayer

The first self-propelled Ag-Chem sprayer was developed in 1967 and was called the Ag-Gator 404SP.  This front wheel driven model featured a gasoline-powered, 61 horsepower Wisconsin brand engine, a stainless-steel 440 gallon product tank, and a 40' boom width.  It was mass-produced between 1969 and 1971.

https://web.archive.org/web/20140203125911/http://www.wisconsinmotors.com:8080/wm/images/catalogs/wisconsin/V465D_V41NID_V461D_Repair.pdf

TerraGator
The first flotation-type applicator produced by Ag-Chem was the Ag-Gator 804.  This model was also the first design to allow the operator to apply either a liquid or a dry product.  This model featured front-wheel drive and an optional 150 HP gasoline-powered or 155 HP diesel power plant.

Beginning with the 1253, Ag-Chem elected to change the model name from Ag-Gator to TerraGator, which is still in use today.  In all models succeeding the 1253, the last digit represents the number of wheels on the chassis.

RoGator

In the 1990s, Ag-Chem saw an emerging market for a self-propelled row-crop sprayer.  Ag-Chem's answer was the RoGator.  The first RoGator was the model 664.

See also
 AGCO
 Sprayer
 Pesticide application

References

External links 
 AGCO Corporation
 AGCO Application Equipment

Agriculture companies of the United States
Manufacturing companies based in Minnesota
1963 establishments in Minnesota
Manufacturing companies established in 1963